Ko Ngai (เกาะไหง) is an island in Krabi Province, but can better be reached via Trang Province on the southern Andaman Coast. Like many other coastal destinations in southern Thailand, it is known for its diving and long white beaches.

Gallery

References

External links

 

Islands of Thailand